A Bag of Shells is an album of music written for film by Jamie Saft which was released on the Tzadik label in 2010. It features the music that Saft wrote and recorded for the documentaries Murderball (2005) and God Grew Tired of Us (2006), Dear Talula (2007) and Brooklyn Exile (2007).

Reception

In his review for Allmusic, Thom Jurek notes that:

Track listing
All compositions by Jamie Saft
 "Murderball" – 1:22   
 "My Biggest Fear" – 4:27   
 "Circle C" – 1:50   
 "Morning Music" – 7:30   
 "Social Security" – 0:50   
 "Joe's Rush" – 2:22   
 "Ninann" – 1:15   
 "Right Again" – 5:16   
 "Piano for the Masses" – 1:10   
 "Parliament" – 3:26   
 "Keith Goes Home" – 4:03   
 "Job Corps" – 1:27   
 "Dezert Blues" – 4:25   
 "Hyphen's Air" – 2:57   
 "Hermans" – 4:52   
 "Brooklyn Exile (Theme)" – 2:32
Tracks 1, 6, 11 & 14 from Murderball (2005), tracks 5, 10 & 12 from God Grew Tired of Us (2006), tracks 2–4, 7–9, 13 & 15 from Dear Talula (2007) and track 16 from Brooklyn Exile (2007).

Personnel
Jamie Saft – piano (tracks 3, 9, 13, 15 & 16), Fender Rhodes (tracks 4, 6 & 8), Mellotron (tracks 6 & 9), organ (tracks 6, 10 & 13), Wurlitzer (track 11), synthesizer (tracks 2 & 11), guitar (tracks 1, 2, 4, 7, 8, 11 & 13), bass guitar (tracks 1, 2, 4, 6–8, 10 & 13), drums (track 8), percussion (tracks 2, 4, 7 & 14), programming (track 14)
Bill McHenry – tenor saxophone (track 15)
Erik Friedlander – cello (track 6)
Yacouba Sissoko – kora (track 10) 
Shanir Ezra Blumenkranz – oud (tracks 5 & 10) 
Vin Cin  – bass (track 16) 
Bobby Previte (tracks 4 & 13), Dmitriy Shnaydman (track 1 & 16) – drums 
Cyro Baptista – percussion (tracks 5 & 10)

References

Tzadik Records soundtracks
Jamie Saft albums
2010 soundtrack albums
Film scores
Soundtrack compilation albums